Adger is a given name. Notable people with the name include:

Adger Armstrong (born 1957), American football player
Adger Cowans (born 1936), American photographer and painter
Adger M. Pace (1882–1959), American hymn writer

See also
 Adger (surname)
 Adger (disambiguation)